The 2012 TCU Horned Frogs football team represented Texas Christian University in the 2012 NCAA Division I FBS football season. The Horned Frogs were led by 12th-year head coach Gary Patterson and played their home games at Amon G. Carter Stadium. This was their first year as members of the Big 12 Conference. They finished the season 7–6, 4–5 in Big 12 play to finish in a four way tie for fifth place. They were invited to the Buffalo Wild Wings Bowl where they were defeated by Michigan State.

With their win of a regular season game on September 8, Gary Patterson became, in the history of the Horned Frogs' program history, its winningest head coach.

Coaching staff

Schedule

Rankings

References

TCU
TCU Horned Frogs football seasons
TCU Horned Frogs football